Giovanni Pérez (born 29 June 1964) is a Guatemalan boxer. He competed in the men's bantamweight event at the 1988 Summer Olympics. At the 1988 Summer Olympics, he lost to Kennedy McKinney of the United States.

References

External links
 

1964 births
Living people
Guatemalan male boxers
Olympic boxers of Guatemala
Boxers at the 1988 Summer Olympics
Place of birth missing (living people)
Bantamweight boxers